Jens Maurits Almey (born 3 July 1996) is a Belgian short track speed skater. He competed in the 2018 Winter Olympics.

References

1996 births
Living people
Belgian male short track speed skaters
Olympic short track speed skaters of Belgium
Short track speed skaters at the 2018 Winter Olympics